Kruidvat is a Dutch retail, pharmacy and drugstore chain specialising in health and beauty products which also has branches in Belgium. The first Kruidvat was opened in September 1975 by Ed During and Dick Siebrand.

It also holds 50% of Rossmann in Poland, Hungary and the Czech Republic, in addition to Superdrug in the United Kingdom since August 2002. Kruidvat Holding was sold to the Hong Kong based company A.S. Watson in November 2002 for €1.3 billion. Kruidvat’s headquarters are located in Renswoude and their main distribution centre is in Heteren, of which construction was announced in March 2007.

The acquisition of Superdrug was fully cleared by the European Union’s Directorate-General for Competition in September 2002. Superdrug was initially sold to Kruidvat in July 2001.

References

External links

 
Kruidvat's A.S. Watson Webpage

Retail companies established in 1975
Pharmacy brands
Retail companies of the Netherlands
Dutch brands
Dutch companies established in 1975
Pharmaceutical companies established in the 20th century
Companies based in Utrecht (province)
Renswoude